An epidural abscess refers to a collection of pus and infectious material located in the epidural space superficial to the dura mater which surrounds the central nervous system. Due to its location adjacent to brain or spinal cord, epidural abscesses have the potential to cause weakness, pain, and paralysis.

Types

Spinal epidural abscess
A spinal epidural abscess (SEA) is a collection of pus or inflammatory granulation between the dura mater and the vertebral column.  Currently the annual incidence rate of SEAs is estimated to be 2.5-3 per 10,000 hospital admissions.  Incidence of SEA is on the rise, due to factors such as an aging population, increase in use of invasive spinal instrumentation, growing number of patients with risk factors such as diabetes and intravenous drug use.  SEAs are more common in posterior than anterior areas, and the most common location is the thoracolumbar area, where epidural space is larger and contains more fat tissue.
SEAs are more common in males, and can occur in all ages, although highest prevalence is during the fifth and seventh decades of life.

Combined treatment - emergency surgery and antibiotics is the preferred treatment for the spinal epidural abscess, removing existing pus (which is tested for microorganisms to select the most appropriate antibiotic) and removing pressure from the spinal cord and nerve roots. Antibiotic therapy should start after obtaining pus for microbiological investigation.

Cranial epidural abscess
A cranial epidural abscess involves pus and granulation tissue accumulation in between the dura mater and cranial bone. These typically arise (along with osteomyelitis of a cranial bone) from infections of the ear or paranasal sinuses. They rarely can be caused by distant infection or an infected cerebral venous sinus thrombosis. Staphylococcus aureus is the most common pathogen. Symptoms include pain at the forehead or ear, pus draining from the ear or sinuses, tenderness overlying the infectious site, fever, neck stiffness, and in rare cases focal seizures.  Treatment requires a combination of antibiotics and surgical removal of infected bone.

References

Bacterial diseases
General surgery